Sacred Journey of Ku-Kai is a series of peace-themed albums by new age artist Kitarō, inspired by the classic Buddhist pilgrimage to the 88 sacred temples on Japan's island of Shikoku (see Shikoku Pilgrimage). Each album in the series has been nominated for a Grammy Award for Best New Age Album.

Sacred Journey of Ku-Kai Vol. 1 (2003)

Sacred Journey of Ku-Kai Vol. 2 (2005)

Charts

Sacred Journey of Ku-Kai Vol. 3 (2007)

Sacred Journey of Ku-Kai Vol. 4 (2010)

Sacred Journey of Ku-Kai Vol. 5 (2017)

Awards and nominations

Personnel
Kitaro - Producer, Composer, Arranger, Engineer, Mixing, Keyboards, Photography
Gary Barlough - Producer (V.1), Engineer (V.2)
Allen Sides - Engineer (V.1)
Doug Sax - Mastering (V.1, 2, 3)
Joe Chiccarelli - Engineer (V.2)
Robert Hadley - Mastering (V.2)
Randy Miller - Orchestration (V.3), Arranger (V.3)
Steven Miller - Engineer (V.3)
Ian Ulibarri - Engineer (V.3)
Timothy Beach - Engineer (V.4)
Tim Gennert - Mastering (V.4)
Paul Lamb - Mastering (V.5), Engineer (V.5)
Musicians
Kristin Stordahl Kanda - Flute (V.1, 2)
Rie Shimomura - Violin (V.1)
Tu Shang Xian - Pipa (V.1, 2)
Jonathan Goldman - Chanting (V.2)
Paul Pesco - Guitars (V.2, 3)
Franci Miho Shimomaebara - Vocals (V.2)
Nawang Khechog - Tibetan Flute & Chanting Voice (V.2)
Keiko Takahashi - Keyboards (V.2, 3, 4), Composer (V.3), Arranger (V.3)
Masayuki Koga - Shakuhachi (V.3)
Alexander Adhami - Cello, Santoor, Guitar, Ebow, Flute (V.3, 4)
Steven Kindler: Violin (V.4)
Diana Dentino: Keyboards (V.4)
Voyce McGinley: Percussion (V.4)
Shinji Ebihara (V.5)

Additional Personnel
Eiichi Naito - Producer, Executive Producer, Management
Dino Malito - Artists & Repertoire, Management
Howard Sapper - Business & Legal Affairs
Tatsuya Hayashi - Marketing (V.1, 2)
Hitoshi Saito - Marketing (V.3, 4)
Atsuko Mizuta - Marketing (V.4)
Kio Griffith - Art Direction, Design

External links
Kitaro Official site (English)
Kitaro Official site (Japanese)
Kitaro Shikoku Peace Bell Project
Kitaro's Official Facebook
Kitaro's Official YouTube page

References 

Kitarō albums
Concept album series